Asturianos is a municipality located in the Sanabria comarca, province of Zamora, Castile and León, Spain. According to the 2009 census (INE), the municipality had a population of 267 inhabitants. The Leonese language is still spoken here.  It is on the Sanabres variant of the Via de la Plata pilgrim camino to Santiago de Compostela.

Villages
Asturianos, 
Cerezal de Sanabria
Entrepeñas, 
Lagarejos de la Carballeda, 
Rioconejos,  
Villar de los Pisones, .

References

Municipalities of the Province of Zamora